El Hito is a municipality in Cuenca, Castile-La Mancha, Spain. It has a population of 223 residents according to the 2007 census.

References 

Municipalities in the Province of Cuenca